Pareiorhaphis stephanus is a species of catfish in the family Loricariidae. It is native to South America, where it occurs in the basins of the Jequitinhonha River and the São Francisco River in Brazil. It is a nocturnal species typically found in rocky and sandy areas. The species reaches 9.9 cm (3.9 inches) in standard length and is believed to be a facultative air-breather.

References 

Loricariidae
Fish of the São Francisco River basin